Khoshchininsky is a rural locality (a khutor) in Trostyanskoye Rural Settlement, Yelansky District, Volgograd Oblast, Russia. The population was 1 as of 2010.

Geography 
Khoshchininsky is located on Khopyorsko-Buzulukskaya Plain, on the right bank of the Buzuluk River, 30 km southwest of Yelan (the district's administrative centre) by road. Rovinsky is the nearest rural locality.

References 

Rural localities in Yelansky District